Michael Graham Satow OBE, or simply Mike Satow was an engineer who was a key person in railway heritage in India and the United Kingdom.  Among other achievements he was pivotal in the establishment of the National Rail Museum, New Delhi, India and creation of a replica of Locomotion No. 1.

Life
Satow was born on 15 June 1916. Educated at Stowe School, he was to damage his hip in a rugby sports accident spending nine months in hospital when he learned shorthand and typing.  Having become behind with his education compared to his peers he elected to take a position with a company manufacturing and erecting heavy equipment, thus following his father into engineering.  

Satow became an engineer and general manager for Imperial Chemical Industries (ICI), and a member of the team who built the Wilton Nylon plant on Teesside in 1947.

Satow was assigned by ICI to India in 1956, his family joining him there later.  Satow said "The first railway that I can ever recall turning me on was the Matheran Railway".  He was to go on to develop a passion on the subject of Steam locomotives constructed in the United Kingdom and exported to India.  In 1963 he organised for Baguley locomotive works No. 2007 to be recovered from a water pumping station at Barrackpore, India and restored at an ICI subsidiary.  He was later to recover that locomotive in 1971 as well as Baldwin Class 10-12-D No. 778 to the Leighton Buzzard Light Railway heritage operation where he was the first president.

He was appointed an honorary adviser to the  National Rail Museum, New Delhi in 1970.

Satow was awarded an Order of the British Empire In the 1971 Birthday Honours For services to British interests in India.

In 1975 Satow featured in The World About Us television series in the episode The Romance of Indian Railways.

Following retirement to England Satow was involved in the construction of a replica of George Stephenson's 1825 steam engineer Locomotion No. 1 which was exhibited at the Beamish Museum.

Satow died on 13 November 1993 aged 77.

Legacy
In addition to his contributions to preservation Satow amassed a collection of notebooks and papers relating to Indian Railways, the information is catalogued by The National Archives of the United Kingdom.

Bibliography

References

Footnotes

Sources
 
 
 
 
 
 
 
 

1916 births
1993 deaths
British engineers
People educated at Stowe School
British people associated with Heritage Railways